Yaddi Bolagh (also Romanized as Yaddī Bolāgh, Yeddī Bolāgh, and Yadī Bolāgh; also known as Yadibulak and Yadibulāq) is a village in Golabar Rural District, in the Central District of Ijrud County, Zanjan Province, Iran. At the 2006 census, its population was 79, in 23 families.

References 

Populated places in Ijrud County